John Ellis (born October 8, 1979) is an American professional golfer.

Ellis was born in San Jose, California. He played college golf at the University of Oregon where he was a First-Team All Pac-10 member as a senior. He turned professional in 2003. Ellis won the Canadian Tour's Order of Merit in 2008. He won three events that year, the Stockton Sports Commission Classic, the Corona Mazatlan Mexican PGA Championship and the Telus Edmonton Open. He won the 2009 GST – Lamkin Tour Championship on the Golden State Golf Tour.

Professional wins (9)

Canadian Tour wins (3)

Other wins (6)
2004 Northern California Open
2005 AG Spanos California Open
2009 GST – Lamkin Tour Championship (Golden State Golf Tour), Monterey Open Championship
2011 Hawaii Pearl Open, California State Open

Results in major championships

CUT = missed the half-way cut
"T" = tied
Note: Ellis only played in the U.S. Open.

External links

American male golfers
Oregon Ducks men's golfers
Golfers from California
Sportspeople from San Jose, California
1979 births
Living people